Open, to Love is a jazz album by Paul Bley. It features Bley performing seven solo piano pieces and is considered not only one of his best albums, but a defining album in the history of the ECM record label. Three of the tracks were composed by ex-wife Carla Bley and another two by Bley's soon-to-be-ex-wife Annette Peacock. The album is one of the first showcases of the pointillism and silence that would inform much of his later work.

Open, to Love was selected as part of the ECM Touchstones series, as one of the most influential recordings on the label.

Reception
The Allmusic review by Thom Jurek awarded the album 5 stars stating "Despite the fact that pianist and composer Paul Bley had been a renowned and innovative jazzman for nearly 20 years, 1973 saw the release of his most mature and visionary work, and one that to this day remains his opus. This is one of the most influential solo piano recordings in jazz history, and certainly one that defined the sound of the German label ECM... Ultimately, what Bley offers is jazz pianism as a new kind of aural poetics, one that treats the extension of the composer's line much as the poet treats the line as the extension of breath. Sheer brilliance".  The Penguin Guide to Jazz said "There is, perhaps, inevitably a hint of deja-vu here and there, but the territory is always much too interesting for that to become a problem".

Track listing
 "Closer" (Carla Bley) - 5:55
 "Ida Lupino" (Carla Bley) - 7:35
 "Started" (Paul Bley) - 5:21
 "Open, to Love" (Annette Peacock) - 7:14
 "Harlem" (Paul Bley) - 3:26
 "Seven" (Carla Bley) - 7:25
 "Nothing Ever Was, Anyway" (Annette Peacock) - 6:02

Personnel
Paul Bley – piano

References

External links
 OPEN TO LOVE at ECM Records

1972 albums
Solo piano jazz albums
ECM Records albums
Albums produced by Manfred Eicher
Paul Bley albums